Lithobolia: or, the Stone-Throwing Devil is a 7,000-word narrative folk tale by Richard Chamberlayne first printed in London in 1698. It is considered an early example of esoteric literature and supernatural horror writing, and has been compared to modern poltergeist stories.

The book's frontispiece describes itself as being "an Exact and True account (by way of Journal) of the various actions of infernal Spirits or (Devils Incarnate) Witches or both: and the great Disturbance and Amazement they gave to George Walton's family at a place called Great Island in the province of New Hampshire in New England, chiefly in throwing about (by an Invisible hand) Stones, Bricks, and Brick-Bats of all sizes, with several other things, as Hammers, Mauls, Iron-Crows, Spits, and other Utensils, as came into their Hellish minds, and this for space of a quarter of a year ..."

The "Stone-Throwing Devil" created quite a sensation on Great Island (present-day New Castle, New Hampshire) in 1682.  Hundreds of stones mysteriously rained down on George Walton's tavern, as well as onto him, his son Shadrach and others in the area over the entire summer.  Yet, no one ever came forward who saw anyone throwing the stones.  Many other unexplained events also occurred at that time.  Demonic voices were heard, and items were flung about inside Walton's tavern.  Prominent Boston minister Increase Mather described  the strange events in his book Illustrious Providences.

George Walton, who was in a property boundary dispute with his neighbor, accused her of witchcraft.  She, in turn, accused him of being a wizard.  Others in the area may also have had reasons to throw stones at Walton.  He was a Quaker.  Quakers were looked upon with great suspicion by Puritans, and just being a Quaker was a crime.  Walton was a successful innkeeper, merchant, and lumberman, and became the largest landowner on the island.  Walton was envied by his less industrious neighbors.  There were also a number of lawsuits over business and property disputes.  He also had two Native American employees, which would have caused great concern so soon after war with the Indians (King Philip's War) and because of the uneasy peace that existed.  His tavern customers included a variety of rowdy outsiders, including "godless" fishermen, who were considered undesirables by others on the island.  Regardless of what caused Walton and his inn to be the victim of a months-long rain of stones, it was the first major outbreak of apparent witchcraft in America.

News of it traveled throughout America and England.  Within a few years, accusations of witchcraft would occur in other New England towns, culminating in the famous witch trials in Salem, Massachusetts.

References

External links
 Lithobolia Text Online

1698 books
English ghosts
Supernatural books
Pamphlets
History of New Hampshire
1698 in North America